Kings Mountain High School is a public high school in Kings Mountain, North Carolina, United States. It is part of the Cleveland County School System which is overseen by the Cleveland County Board of Education, and it is one of the county's five public high schools. Kings Mountain, North Carolina is considered part of the Shelby, North Carolina metro area.

History and description
In 1905, Kings Mountain Graded School was founded. Known as Central School, all grade levels (1–11) were in one building, which was not fully completed for five years.

The school has about 80 faculty members. The building features a library which is part of Cleve-net (a regional library network) and an auditorium.

Curriculum
Coursework at KMHS includes Advanced Placement classes. The school has a Spanish program and theatre production classes.

Students
The high school offers classes for grades 9 through 12. The school graduates 94% of its senior class. The total student population is about 1250.

Athletics
Kings Mountain High School has a football team. The team played during the pandemic of COVID-19. The school has a girls' volleyball team and is part of the Big South 3A conference.

References

External links
 

Schools in North Carolina
1905 establishments in North Carolina
Kings Mountain, North Carolina